Wonderful Mama is a 2013 South Korean television series starring Bae Jong-ok with Jeong Yu-mi, Kim Ji-seok and Park Bo-gum. It premiered on April 13, 2013, and ended on September 22, 2013, airing on SBS every Saturday and Sunday at 20:40 for 48 episodes.

Synopsis
Yoon Bok-hee has accomplished a lot in her life, working her way up from running a money-lending market stand to managing millions. But her priorities shift when she's faced with a diagnosis of early-onset Alzheimer's. Her degenerative disease threatens her ability to manage her business and eventually the details of her daily life.

After receiving her diagnosis, she realizes that her most important goal is helping her children to grow up in a hurry. She must teach them how to run the family business and they must also learn how to care for her when she can no longer care for herself. It won't be easy as they still have a lot of growing up to do.

Cast

Main
Bae Jong-ok as Yoon Bok-hee
A self-made woman who went from working a tiny market stand to becoming a successful loan shark who owns multi-million-won buildings. She is diagnosed with early-onset Alzheimer's disease.
Jeong Yu-mi as Go Young-chae
Spoiled daughter of Bok-hee, she is a shopaholic and fashionista
Kim Ji-seok as Go Young-soo
 Bok-hee's son and Young-chae's twin brother, directionless with his career
Park Bo-gum as Go Young-joon
Bok-hee's youngest child who is also a mama's boy, a playboy high-school student

Supporting

Jung Gyu-woon as Jang Hoon-nam
Ahn Nae-sang as Jang Ki-nam
Kyeon Mi-ri as Kim Young-yi
 Lee Hwa-kyum as Jang Go-eun
Lee Min-woo as Lee Jang-ho
Lee Chung-ah as Oh Da-jung
Yoo In-young as Lee Soo-jin
Kim Chung as Choi Eun-ok
Yoon Joo-hee as Kim Nan-hee
Hwang Jae-won as Lee Ji-woo
Jung Kyung-ho as Sasa Kim
Lee Kyung-shil as Jaegal Jeom-soon
Heo Jung-eun as Kim Ha-pil
Lee Suk-joon as Han Dong-soo
Hwang Dong-joo as Hong Yoon-jae
Shin Ji-soo as Hee-jin
Yoon Ji-min as Han Se-ah

Ratings 
In the tables below, the blue numbers represent the lowest ratings and the red numbers represent the highest ratings.

Awards and nominations

International broadcast
 It aired in Vietnam on TodayTV VTC7 from February 9, 2014, under the title Mẹ Ơi, Cố Lên.

Notes

References

External links
Wonderful Mama official SBS website 

Seoul Broadcasting System television dramas
2013 South Korean television series debuts
2013 South Korean television series endings
Korean-language television shows
South Korean romance television series